Czarna Wieś (meaning "black village") may refer to the following places in Poland:
Czarna Wieś, Greater Poland Voivodeship (west-central Poland)
Czarna Wieś, Masovian Voivodeship (east-central Poland)
Czarna Wieś, Podlaskie Voivodeship (north-east Poland)
Czarna Wieś, Silesian Voivodeship (south Poland)
Czarna Wieś, part of the Krowodrza district of Kraków